Hickman County is the name of several counties in the United States:

 Hickman County, Kentucky 
 Hickman County, Tennessee